Beryllium bromide is the chemical compound with the formula BeBr2. It is very hygroscopic and dissolves well in water.  The compound is a polymer with tetrahedral coordinated Be centres.

Preparation and reactions
It can be prepared by reacting beryllium metal with elemental bromine at temperatures of 500 °C to 700 °C:
Be  +  Br2  →  BeBr2

Beryllium bromide is also formed when treating beryllium oxide with hydrobromic acid:
BeO  +  2 HBr  →  BeBr2  +  H2O

It hydrolyzes slowly in water: BeBr2 + 2 H2O → 2 HBr + Be(OH)2

Structure
Two forms (polymorphs) of BeBr2 are known. Both structures consist of tetrahedral Be2+ centers interconnected by doubly bridging bromide ligands.  One form consist of edge-sharing polytetrahedra.  The other form resembles zinc iodide with interconnected adamantane-like cages.

Safety
Beryllium compounds are toxic if inhaled or ingested.

References

Beryllium compounds
Bromides
Alkaline earth metal halides
Inorganic polymers